Aethomyias is a genus of passerine birds in the family Acanthizidae that are endemic to New Guinea.

A molecular phylogenetic study of the scrubwrens and mouse-warblers published in 2018 led to a substantial revision of the taxonomic classification. In the reorganisation the genus Aethomyias was resurrected to bring together a group of scrubwrens that had previously been placed in the genera Sericornis and Crateroscelis. The genus Aethomyias had originally been introduced by the English ornithologist Richard Bowdler Sharpe in 1879 with the pale-billed scrubwren (Aethomyias spilodera) as the type species. The name of the genus combines the Ancient Greek aēthēs "unusual" or "change" with the Modern Latin  meaning "flycatcher".

The genus contains six species:
 Bicolored scrubwren, Aethomyias nigrorufus
 Pale-billed scrubwren, Aethomyias spilodera
 Vogelkop scrubwren, Aethomyias rufescens
 Buff-faced scrubwren, Aethomyias perspicillatus
 Papuan scrubwren, Aethomyias  papuensis
 Grey-green scrubwren, Aethomyias arfakianus

References

 
Bird genera
Acanthizidae